Dennis McGuire (born 6 June 1939) is an Australian sprint canoeist who competed in the mid-1960s. He finished ninth in the K-4 1000 m event at the 1964 Summer Olympics in Tokyo.

References
Sports-reference.com profile

1939 births
Living people
Australian male canoeists
Canoeists at the 1964 Summer Olympics
Olympic canoeists of Australia